Sándor Kiss (born 3 June 1962) is a Hungarian wrestler. He competed in the men's freestyle 100 kg at the 1992 Summer Olympics.

References

External links
 

1962 births
Living people
Hungarian male sport wrestlers
Olympic wrestlers of Hungary
Wrestlers at the 1992 Summer Olympics
People from Tura, Hungary
Sportspeople from Pest County